William "Billy" Flora (fl. 1755–1818) was a free-born African American from Virginia who served as a soldier on the Patriot side in the American Revolutionary War. He fought under Colonel William Woodford in the Battle of Great Bridge in December 1775, where he is widely acknowledged as the hero of the battle. A sentry at the bridge reported he was the last to cross as the British advanced. As he retreated from his post, under heavy fire from the British line, he ripped up a plank from the bridge. This made the British crossing, under fire from the colonials, impossible. As a result, the British were forced to withdraw to their ships.  The only casualty on the American side survived to speak very highly of Flora and his courage.

Before the war Flora owned a prosperous livery stable. After the war, with the purchase and sale of property, he grew his business into a tidy fortune.

Early life
William Flora was born, date unknown, in Portsmouth, Virginia Colony, of British North America, in the British Empire, to a free-born, African American family. Before the war, Flora owned a prosperous livery stable, in Portsmouth.

American Revolutionary War
During the American Revolutionary War, William Flora fought under Colonel William Woodford in the Virginia State Forces at the Battle of Great Bridge in December 1775, where he is widely acknowledged as the Patriot hero of the battle. A sentry at the bridge reported he was the last to cross, as the British advanced. As Flora retreated from his post under heavy fire from the British line, he ripped up a plank from the bridge. This made the British crossing under fire from the Patriots impossible. As a result, the British were forced to withdraw to their ships.  The only casualty, a soldier with a wounded thumb, on the American side survived, to speak very highly of William Flora and his courage.

According to Continental Army muster and pay rolls, William Flora, in November 1776, served under "Captain William Grymes's company of the 15th Virginia Regiment", which participated in the 1777 Battles of Brandywine and Germantown and the 1778 Battle of Monmouth. While with his fellow soldiers in South Carolina, Flora avoided being captured by the British, in the 1780 Siege of Charleston where the majority of the regiment was captured. During the war, because the unit kept getting smaller, it was consolidated into the 11th Virginia Regiment and finally into the 5th Virginia Regiment, until the end of the war. Flora also fought in the Battle of Yorktown in 1781.

Post-war years
After the war, as a freight company owner and land speculator, he accumulated his earnings into a tidy fortune.

References
Carey, Charles W., Jr.  "Flora, William". American National Biography Online, American Council of Learned Societies.  Oxford:  Oxford University Press, Inc., (2000).  
Davis, Burke.  Black Heroes of the American Revolution, (1976). 
Jackson, Porter.  William Flora, in Virginia Negro Soldiers and Seamen in the Revolutionary War, (1944).
Kaplan, Sidney.  The Black Presence in the Era of the American Revolution 1770-1800, (1973). 
Quarles, Benjamin.  The Negro in the American Revolution, (1961).

Continental Army soldiers
People of Virginia in the American Revolution
Year of death unknown
Year of birth unknown
Black Patriots